Marx & Lennon: The Parallel Sayings is an anthology of 400 humorous quotes from John Lennon and Groucho Marx on a variety of themes. Quotations are thematically collected in such a way that the top section of a page contains Marx's quotes, and the bottom section contains Lennon's. The book is edited by Joey Green and includes an introduction by Arthur Marx and a foreword by Yoko Ono. Including the index, it is 254 pages long.

External links 
Hyperion Books Page
B&N Page

2005 non-fiction books
Comedy books
John Lennon
Marx Brothers